Fiona Gélin is a French actress.

Born Bénédicte Gélin, the daughter of actor Daniel Gélin, she started her acting career at an early age and made her breakthrough in cinema with the role Inspector Sabine Clément in the 1985 José Pinheiro film Parole de flic starring Alain Delon. Another role worthy of mention came in 1987 with Aldo Lado film Scirocco. Through her father, her half-siblings were Xavier Gélin and Maria Schneider. They were also actors.

Filmography
Scirocco (1987)
 Oh God, Women Are So Loving (1994)

References

External links

1962 births
Living people
French film actresses
French stage actresses
People from Boulogne-Billancourt